Macau Standard Time (Portuguese: Hora Oficial de Macau) is the time in Macau. The time is UTC+8 all year round, and daylight saving time has not been applied since 1980.

Macau Standard Time is currently in the same time zone as China Standard Time, also known as Beijing Standard Time or simply Beijing Time used in the rest of China, and Hong Kong Time in Hong Kong.

History

Daylight saving time

See also
 Time in Australia - Australian Western Standard Time is also UTC+08:00
 Time in China
 Time in Indonesia
 Time in Malaysia
 Time in Mongolia
 Time in Russia
 Time in Singapore
 Time in Taiwan
 Time in Vietnam § Saigon Standard Time

References 

Geography of Macau
Time zones